Tasha Smith (born February 28, 1971) is an American actress, director and producer. She began her career in a starring role on the NBC comedy series Boston Common (1996–97), and she later appeared in numerous movies and television series.

Smith has appeared in the films The Whole Ten Yards (2004), Daddy's Little Girls (2007), The Longshots (2008), Couples Retreat (2009), and Jumping the Broom (2011). She starred as Angela Williams in the Tyler Perry films Why Did I Get Married? (2007), its sequel Why Did I Get Married Too? (2010), and on the television series based on the movies, For Better or Worse (2011–2017). In 2015, she began a recurring role as Carol Holloway on the Fox musical drama series Empire. Later in the same year, Smith made her directorial debut.

Early life and education
Tasha Smith was born on February 28, 1971, in Camden, New Jersey, and was raised by a single mother. She has an identical twin sister Sidra Smith, who currently lives in Harlem. Smith dropped out of Camden High School in her freshman year, and at age 19 moved to California.

Career
Smith made her acting debut with a small role in the comedy film Twin Sitters (1994). From 1996 to 1997, she starred in the NBC comedy series, Boston Common. Later in 1997, she was cast alongside Tom Arnold in another short-lived comedy series, The Tom Show on The WB. In 2000, she had supporting role in the HBO miniseries, The Corner in which she played a drug addict. In the 2000s, Smith had guest starring roles on The Parkers, Without a Trace, Nip/Tuck, and Girlfriends. She has made number of supporting roles in movies such as Playas Ball (2003), The Whole Ten Yards (2004), and ATL (2006).

Smith has played roles in multiple Tyler Perry projects. In 2007, she appeared as the main antagonist in the romantic comedy-drama film, Daddy's Little Girls. She played the role of Angela Williams in the Why Did I Get Married? (2007), and its sequel Why Did I Get Married Too? (2010). The role she later played in the comedy series based on films, Tyler Perry's For Better or Worse.

Smith co-starred alongside Ice Cube and Keke Palmer in the family comedy-drama film, The Longshots (2008). She had supporting role in the romantic comedy film Couples Retreat (2009), and co-starred alongside Salli Richardson, Nicole Ari Parker and Michael B. Jordan in Pastor Brown (2010). In 2011, she appeared in the comedy-drama film Jumping the Broom alongside Angela Bassett and Paula Patton, and in 2014, she played a psychotherapist in the erotic thriller, Addicted. In 2014, she also was cast in a recurring role in the Fox drama series Empire as Carol Hardaway, Cookie Lyon's younger sister.

In 2015, Smith made her directorial debut with the short film Boxed in, which premiered during the 19th Annual American Black Film Festival. In 2017, Smith directed the television film When Love Kills: The Falicia Blakely Story, starring Lil Mama and Lance Gross, based on a true story. It premiered to 1.6 million viewers, ranking as TV One's #1 original movie premiere of all time among all key demos. In October 2017, she also directed an episode in the BET drama anthology series Tales. Smith worked as Mary J. Blige's acting coach for her role in Mudbound.

In 2019, Smith appeared in the comedy-drama film Dolemite Is My Name, and starred opposite Lisa Kudrow and Whitney Cummings in the Amazon comedy pilot Good People. Also that year, she directed episodes of Star, 9-1-1 and Black Lightning. In 2020, Smith directed the episode "Legacy" on the Starz TV series P-Valley. In 2021, Smith directed the Starz drama series Black Mafia Family.

In 2022, it was announced that Smith will be starring in the Lee Daniels' horror/thriller The Deliverance with Mo'Nique, Andra Day, Omar Epps, and Miss Lawrence.

Personal life
In December 2010, Smith married her boyfriend of one-year Keith Douglas, who was also her manager. In November 2014, Smith appeared in court to request a restraining order against Douglas. In documents filed prior to the court appearance, she accused him of having affairs with other women. Smith's friend Tisha Campbell-Martin acted as a character witness. The final divorce decree was issued in March 2015. However, Smith contested the divorce by alleging that Douglas concealed information from her that she should have known before the marriage. Smith alleged that Douglas was not "man of the cloth" that he presented himself to be during their courtship. She also said that, if she had known about Douglas' background, she would not have married him. The allegations about Douglas' background included five marriages before he married Smith, multiple children that he did not claim and disclose to Smith, and non-payment of income taxes for nearly a decade. The judge in the case granted Smith an annulment of the marriage in December 2015 on the basis of fraud committed by Douglas.

In an interview with D.L. Hughley in 2014, Tasha Smith shared that during most of her teenage years and young adulthood she was an atheist, despite her family being devout religious Christians, because of the "hardships, tragedies, and misfortune she saw her family endure throughout her childhood." However, she said after learning that one of her family members had gotten very sick and was not able to visit them at the hospital, she decided to turn to prayer "and ask God to show himself to her and help her unbelief." After doing so, she says that she became a devout, practicing Christian and uses her Christian faith as one of her motivators for her career and philanthropy.

Smith is the creator of TSAW - an actor's workshop that empowers and inspires performers at various stages in their careers with focus on the Black community.

Filmography

Film

Television

Directing

References

External links
 
 

1971 births
20th-century American actresses
21st-century American actresses
Actors from Camden, New Jersey
Actresses from New Jersey
African-American actresses
African-American Christians
American film actresses
American television actresses
Camden High School (New Jersey) alumni
Converts to Protestantism from atheism or agnosticism
Living people
American twins
Identical twins
20th-century African-American women
20th-century African-American people
21st-century African-American women
21st-century African-American people
American people of Tikar descent
Tikar people